Nationalbank may refer to:

 Danmarks Nationalbank, the central bank of Denmark
 Oesterreichische Nationalbank, Austria's central bank

See also

 National bank (disambiguation)